Presidentbreen ("The President Glacier") is a glacier in Haakon VII Land at Spitsbergen, Svalbard. The glacier is tributary to the Tinayrebreen, and is surrounded by the mountains of Presidenten, Monarken, Kiliantoppen, Snødomen and Fallièresfjella.

References

Glaciers of Spitsbergen